The clown rasbora (Rasbora kalochroma) is a species of ray-finned fish in the genus Rasbora.

References 

Rasboras
Freshwater fish of Indonesia
Freshwater fish of Malaysia
Freshwater fish of Borneo
Fauna of Sumatra
Taxa named by Pieter Bleeker
Fish described in 1851